Table tennis was contested from 22 September 1986 to 30 September 1986 at the 1986 Asian Games in Seoul, South Korea.

Table tennis had team, doubles and singles events for men and women, as well as a mixed doubles competition. China finished first in medal table by winning four gold medals.

Medalists

Medal table

References

 ITTF Database

External links
 ITTF 

 
1986 Asian Games events
1986
Asian Games
1986 Asian Games